The 2020–21 National Cricket League is the twenty-second edition of the National Cricket League (NCL), a first-class cricket competition that is being held in Bangladesh. The tournament started on 22 March 2021, with the Bangladesh Cricket Board (BCB) using the tournament as preparation for Bangladesh's tour of Sri Lanka in April 2021. The eight teams taking part were placed into two tiers, with the tournament scheduled to end on 29 April 2021. Khulna Division are the defending champions.

The opening round of matches saw Chittagong Division win only their third first-class match in a period of seven years, beating Rajshahi Division by 88 runs. In round two, Barisal Division were bowled out twice by Rajshahi Division inside two days, with Barisal's match aggregate of 142 runs becoming the lowest total in a first-class match in Bangladesh. On 1 April 2021, the remaining matches in the tournament were postponed due to the rising COVID-19 cases in the country.

Fixtures

Tier 1

Tier 2

References

External links
 Series home at ESPN Cricinfo

2020-21
Bangladesh National Cricket League
2021 in Bangladeshi cricket
Bangladeshi cricket seasons from 2000–01
National Cricket League